MyMajorCompany is a crowdfunding platform in Europe.

Company history
Since 2007, MyMajorCompany has been an independent record label. In hard times for the music industry, its co-funders began enrolling internet users in financing young artists. During its first year, MyMajorCompany raised one million Euros for artists including Grégoire (1.5 million albums sold), Irma, and Joyce Jonathan (both platinum-selling artists). In 2012, the company broadened its business model to include cinema, publishing, video games, arts, and entrepreneurship.

References

Companies based in Paris
Financial services companies established in 2007
Crowdfunding platforms of France